Elena Gjeorgjievska (born 27 March 1990 in Struga) is a Macedonian female handballer who plays as a right back for Măgura Cisnădie and the North Macedonia national team.

International honours  
EHF Champions League:
Winner: 2012 
Finalist: 2014
EHF Challenge Cup:
Semifinalist: 2010

Individual awards
 Carpathian Trophy Top Scorer: 2017

References   
 

1990 births
Living people
Macedonian female handball players
Sportspeople from Struga
Expatriate handball players
Macedonian expatriate sportspeople in Montenegro
Macedonian expatriate sportspeople in Romania
Macedonian expatriate sportspeople in Hungary
Macedonian expatriate sportspeople in Croatia
CS Minaur Baia Mare (women's handball) players
RK Podravka Koprivnica players